Claude Deschamps (c. 1600 – 1681), better known as de Villiers, was a French playwright and actor. His 1660 tragicomedy, Le Festin de pierre ou le Fils criminel, was a forerunner of Molière's Dom Juan. He also wrote burlesque comedies L'Apothicaire dévalisé (1660) and Les Ramoneurs (1662). As an actor, de Villiers often played servant roles and participated in the Théâtre du Marais and Hôtel de Bourgogne troupes.

References

External links 
 His plays and their presentations on CÉSAR

17th-century French male actors
French male stage actors
17th-century French dramatists and playwrights
17th-century French male writers
1681 deaths
Year of birth uncertain